Saint-Tropez, San Tropez and St. Tropez may refer to:
St. Tropez (self-tan brand), a self-tanning brand
Torpes of Pisa, a saint and martyr
San Torpete, a church of Torpes of Pisa
Saint-Tropez, a place in French Riviera
"San Tropez", a song by Pink Floyd from their 1971 album Meddle
"St. Tropez (Party Girl)" an unreleased song by Lana Del Rey
"St. Tropez", a song by Dusty Trails from their 2000 album Dusty Trails
"Sen Trope", a song by Azis
St. Tropez, a condominium in Manhattan
"St. Tropez", a song by J. Cole on his album 2014 Forest Hills Drive 
"Saint-Tropez", a song by Post Malone on his album Hollywood's Bleeding